Panopeus herbstii (the black-fingered mud crab, black-clawed mud crab, Atlantic mud crab or sometimes common mud crab) is a true crab, belonging to the infraorder Brachyura, and is the largest of the mud crabs.

Panopeus herbstii is small, growing to about 4 cm, with black-tipped claws of unequal size. P. herbstii has a strong exoskeleton, with very thick and strong claws. The shell is a dull gray and brown color.

Panopeus herbstii is found along the Atlantic coast of North America, from Boston, Massachusetts to Santa Catarina, Brazil and on Bermuda. It is the most common xanthid crab on the east coast of the United States. It is found on muddy bottoms, where it takes refuge under stones and shells or among sponges and weeds, but it is rarely seen in the open. It feeds mainly on young clams, oysters, and periwinkles; it cracks open their shells with its strong claws. Mud crabs are especially fond of hermit crabs, which are grasped by the legs and pulled out of their protective shells. Like most mud crabs, it is a scavenger. Young P. herbstii are an important food source to other marine animals. It mainly eats oysters.

References

Xanthoidea
Crustaceans of the Atlantic Ocean
Crustaceans described in 1834
Taxa named by Henri Milne-Edwards